Gaussian units constitute a metric system of physical units. This system is the most common of the several electromagnetic unit systems based on cgs (centimetre–gram–second) units. It is also called the Gaussian unit system, Gaussian-cgs units, or often just cgs units. The term "cgs units" is ambiguous and therefore to be avoided if possible: there are several variants of cgs with conflicting definitions of electromagnetic quantities and units.

SI units predominate in most fields, and continue to increase in popularity at the expense of Gaussian units. Alternative unit systems also exist. Conversions between quantities in Gaussian and SI units are  direct unit conversions, because the quantities themselves are defined differently in each system. This means that the equations expressing physical laws of electromagnetism—such as Maxwell's—will change depending on the system of units employed. As an example, quantities that are dimensionless in one system may have dimension in the other.

Alternative unit systems 

The Gaussian unit system is just one of several electromagnetic unit systems within CGS. Others include "electrostatic units", "electromagnetic units", and Heaviside–Lorentz units.

Some other unit systems are called "natural units", a category that includes Hartree atomic units, Planck units, and others.

The International System of Units (SI), with the associated International System of Quantities (ISQ), is by far the most common system of units today. In engineering and practical areas, SI is nearly universal and has been for decades. In technical, scientific literature (such as theoretical physics and astronomy), Gaussian units were predominant until recent decades, but are now getting progressively less so. The 8th SI Brochure acknowledges that the CGS-Gaussian unit system has advantages in classical and relativistic electrodynamics, but the 9th SI Brochure makes no mention of CGS systems.

Natural units may be used in more theoretical and abstract fields of physics, particularly particle physics and string theory.

Major differences between Gaussian and SI systems

"Rationalized" unit systems 

One difference between Gaussian and SI units is in the factors of 4π in various formulas. With SI electromagnetic units, called rationalized, Maxwell's equations have no explicit factors of 4π in the formulae, whereas the inverse-square force laws – Coulomb's law and the Biot–Savart law – do have a factor of 4π attached to the r. With Gaussian units, called unrationalized (and unlike Heaviside–Lorentz units), the situation is reversed: two of Maxwell's equations have factors of 4π in the formulas, while both of the inverse-square force laws, Coulomb's law and the Biot–Savart law, have no factor of 4π attached to r in the denominator.

(The quantity 4π appears because 4πr is the surface area of the sphere of radius r, which reflects the geometry of the configuration. For details, see the articles Relation between Gauss's law and Coulomb's law and Inverse-square law.)

Unit of charge 

A major difference between the Gaussian system and the ISQ is in the respective definitions of the quantity charge. In the ISQ, a separate base dimension, electric current, with the associated SI unit, the ampere, is associated with electromagnetic phenomena, with the consequence that a unit of electrical charge (1 coulomb = 1 ampere × 1 second) is a physical quantity that cannot be expressed purely in terms of the mechanical units (kilogram, metre, second). On the other hand, in the Gaussian system, the unit of electric charge (the statcoulomb, statC) can be written entirely as a dimensional combination of the non-electrical base units (gram, centimetre, second), as:
 = .

For example, Coulomb's law in Gaussian units has no constant:

where F is the repulsive force between two electrical charges, Q and Q are the two charges in question, and r is the distance separating them. If Q and Q are expressed in statC and r in cm, then the unit of F that is coherent with these units is the dyne.

The same law in the ISQ is:

where ε0 is the vacuum permittivity, a quantity that is not dimensionless: it has dimension (charge)2 (time)2 (mass)−1 (length)−3. Without ε0, the equation would be dimensionally inconsistent with the quantities as defined in the ISQ, whereas the quantity ε0 does not appear in Gaussian equations.  This is an example of how some dimensional physical constants can be eliminated from the expressions of physical law by the choice of definition of quantities.  In the ISQ, 1/ε0 converts or scales flux density, D, to the corresponding electric field, E (the latter has dimension of force per charge), while in the Gaussian system, electric flux density is the same quantity as electric field strength in free space aside from a dimensionless constant factor.

In the Gaussian system, the speed of light c appears directly in electromagnetic formulas like Maxwell's equations (see below), whereas in the ISQ it appears via the product .

Units for magnetism 

In the Gaussian system, unlike the ISQ, the electric field E and the magnetic field B have the same dimension. This amounts to a factor of c between how B is defined in the two unit systems, on top of the other differences. (The same factor applies to other magnetic quantities such as H and M.) For example, in a planar light wave in vacuum,  in Gaussian units, while  in the ISQ.

Polarization, magnetization 

There are further differences between Gaussian system and the ISQ in how quantities related to polarization and magnetization are defined. For one thing, in the Gaussian system, all of the following quantities have the same dimension: E, D, P, B, H, and M. A further point is that the electric and magnetic susceptibility of a material is dimensionless in both Gaussian system and the ISQ, but a given material will have a different numerical susceptibility in the two systems. (Equation is given below.)

List of equations 

This section has a list of the basic formulae of electromagnetism, given in both the Gaussian system and the International System of Quantities (ISQ). Most symbol names are not given; for complete explanations and definitions, please click to the appropriate dedicated article for each equation. A simple conversion scheme for use when tables are not available may be found in
Ref.
All formulas except otherwise noted are from Ref.

Maxwell's equations 

Here are Maxwell's equations, both in macroscopic and microscopic forms. Only the "differential form" of the equations is given, not the "integral form"; to get the integral forms apply the divergence theorem or Kelvin–Stokes theorem.

Other basic laws

Dielectric and magnetic materials 

Below are the expressions for the various fields in a dielectric medium. It is assumed here for simplicity that the medium is homogeneous, linear, isotropic, and nondispersive, so that the permittivity is a simple constant.

where
E and D are the electric field and displacement field, respectively;
P is the polarization density;
 is the permittivity;
 is the permittivity of vacuum (used in the SI system, but meaningless in Gaussian units);
 is the electric susceptibility

Next, here are the expressions for the various fields in a magnetic medium. Again, it is assumed that the medium is homogeneous, linear, isotropic, and nondispersive, so that the permeability is a simple constant.

where
B and H are the magnetic fields
M is magnetization
 is magnetic permeability
 is the permeability of vacuum (used in the SI system, but meaningless in Gaussian units);
 is the magnetic susceptibility

Vector and scalar potentials 

The electric and magnetic fields can be written in terms of a vector potential A and a scalar potential φ:

Electrical circuit 

where
 Q is the quantity of electricity
 I is the electric current
 V is the electric potential
 Φ is the magnetic flux
 R is the electrical resistance
 C is the capacitance
 L is the inductance

Fundamental constants

Electromagnetic unit names 
(For non-electromagnetic units, see Centimetre–gram–second system of units.)

Note: The SI quantities  and  satisfy .

The conversion factors are written both symbolically and numerically. The numerical conversion factors can be derived from the symbolic conversion factors by dimensional analysis. For example, the top row says , a relation which can be verified with dimensional analysis, by expanding  and C in SI base units, and expanding Fr in Gaussian base units.

It is surprising to think of measuring capacitance in centimetres. One useful example is that a centimetre of capacitance is the capacitance between a sphere of radius 1 cm in vacuum and infinity.

Another surprising unit is measuring resistivity in units of seconds. A physical example is: Take a parallel-plate capacitor, which has a "leaky" dielectric with permittivity 1 but a finite resistivity. After charging it up, the capacitor will discharge itself over time, due to current leaking through the dielectric. If the resistivity of the dielectric is X seconds, the half-life of the discharge is ~0.05X seconds. This result is independent of the size, shape, and charge of the capacitor, and therefore this example illuminates the fundamental connection between resistivity and time units.

Dimensionally equivalent units 
A number of the units defined by the table have different names but are in fact dimensionally equivalent – i.e., they have the same expression in terms of the base units cm, g, s. (This is analogous to the distinction in SI between becquerel and Hz, or between newton-metre and joule.) The different names help avoid ambiguities and misunderstandings as to what physical quantity is being measured. In particular, all of the following quantities are dimensionally equivalent in Gaussian units, but they are nevertheless given different unit names as follows:

General rules to translate a formula 

Any formula can be converted between Gaussian and SI units by using the symbolic conversion factors from Table 1 above.

For example, the electric field of a stationary point charge has the ISQ formula

where r is distance, and the "I" superscript indicates that the electric field and charge are defined as in the ISQ. If we want the formula to instead use the Gaussian definitions of electric field and charge, we look up how these are related using Table 1, which says:

Therefore, after substituting and simplifying, we get the Gaussian-system formula:

which is the correct Gaussian-system formula, as mentioned in a previous section.

For convenience, the table below has a compilation of the symbolic conversion factors from Table 1. To convert any formula from Gaussian system to the ISQ using this table, replace each symbol in the Gaussian column by the corresponding expression in the SI column (vice versa to convert the other way). This will reproduce any of the specific formulas given in the list above, such as Maxwell's equations, as well as any other formula not listed. For some examples of how to use this table, see:

Notes and references

External links 
Comprehensive list of Gaussian unit names, and their expressions in base units
The evolution of the Gaussian Units by Dan Petru Danescu

Centimetre–gram–second system of units
Systems of units
Carl Friedrich Gauss